Denmark – Hungary relations refers to the current and historical relations between Denmark and Hungary. Denmark has an embassy in Budapest. Hungary has an embassy in Copenhagen. Diplomatic relations were established on 10 May 1948. Both countries are members of EU and NATO.

History

In World War II, Hungary sent 12.000 soldiers to Denmark, through Germany. After the Hungarian Revolution of 1956, 1,400 Hungarians fled to Denmark. 137 million DKK were collected to help the Hungarians. In 1948, a payments agreement was signed between both countries. On 20 October 1969, Denmark and Hungary signed an agreement on economic, industrial, and technical cooperation. An agreement on compensation for Danish interests in Hungary was signed on 18 June 1965.

Cooperation and investment
Denmark, in bilateral cooperation, is helping Hungary with agriculture, education, and health. Coloplast, Lego and A. P. Moller-Maersk Group are some of the Danish investors in Hungary.

Culture
More than 200 Danish artists participated in the Budapest Spring Festival 2010, which started 5 April.

Paul Bang-Jensen

Povl Bang-Jensen was a Danish diplomat, later a civil service in UN. In 1956 he questioned 80 Hungarian refugees in New York City who had fled Hungary. When UN Secretary General Dag Hammarskjöld demanded the names of the refugees, Jensen refused to do so in fear that it would come in communist security services. Ultimately, Jensen burned the list of names. Jensen is very well known in Hungary.

High level visits
In 1987, Margrethe II of Denmark visited Hungary. Former Prime Minister of Hungary, Ferenc Gyurcsány visited Denmark on 12 June 2007. On 19 March 2010, Crown Prince Frederik and Per Stig Møller visited Budapest Spring Festival.

See also 
 Foreign relations of Denmark
 Foreign relations of Hungary
 Accession of Hungary to the European Union

References

External links
 Long-term Agreement on the development of economic, industrial, technological and scientific co-operation. Signed at Budapest on 18 February 1976
 Danish - Hungarian Friendship Association

 
Hungary
Bilateral relations of Hungary